Alfonso Houston Jiménez González (born October 30, 1957) is a Mexican former professional baseball player who played shortstop in Major League Baseball from 1983 through 1988. He played for the Minnesota Twins, Pittsburgh Pirates and Cleveland Indians

Playing career

Early years 
Jiménez began his playing career with Puebla in 1974 at the age of 16. In 1975, he was signed as a free agent by the Chicago Cubs organization, where he played for the Key West Cubs. After batting just .215 as their regular shortstop, he returned to Pericos for two seasons. He had a brief trial with the Chicago White Sox organization in 1978, batting .220 in 13 games.

Twins 
After two more seasons with Puebla, Jiménez signed with the Minnesota Twins before the 1981 season. At the end of spring training, he was purchased by the Broncos de Reynosa. After spending a season and a half with Reynosa, he was reacquired by the Twins, finishing the season with the Toledo Mud Hens.

Jiménez started 1983 with the Mud Hens, but was called up to the majors in June. He spent the rest of the season splitting time at shortstop with Ron Washington. The following year, Jiménez became the Twins' starter, playing in 108 games. However, 1984 would prove to be the only full season he spent at the major league level. After batting just .201, he spent all of the 1985 season with Toledo, then was released just before the start of the 1986 season.

Pirates and Indians 
After spending 1986 out of organized ball, Jiménez signed with the Pittsburgh Pirates in December. He spent most of the 1987 season with the Vancouver Canadians, playing in just six games for the Pirates, for whom he went hitless in 7 at bats. He became a free agent after the season.

In June 1988, Jiménez signed with the Cleveland Indians. His experience was similar to the previous year, as he spent most of the season in Triple-A with the Colorado Springs Sky Sox. He appeared in eight games with the Indians, managing just one hit in 21 at-bats.

Back to Mexico 
After spending several years playing winter ball, Jiménez returned to the Mexican League in 1993 with the Saraperos de Saltillo. He played there until his retirement in 2001.

Managerial career 
While still active with Saltillo, he was named the clubs' manager in 1999. After leaving Saltillo in 2001, he managed the Guerreros de Oaxaca from 2002 until 2004. He managed the Diablos Rojos de México in 2005 and the Potros de Tijuana at the start of 2006.

After being let go by Tijuana, Jiménez was named to the coaching staff of the Tri-City Dust Devils, a class-A farm team for the Colorado Rockies. In 2007, he became the hitting coach for the Asheville Tourists, where he served for two seasons. He was also elected to the Mexican Professional Baseball Hall of Fame in 2007.

Jiménez was named Puebla's manager in 2009. That year, he served as third base coach for the Mexico national baseball team at the 2009 World Baseball Classic.

In 2013, he was enshrined into the Caribbean Baseball Hall of Fame.
In February 2013 he was named again Puebla's manager.

Jiménez was named manager of the Olmecas de Tabasco for the 2018 season.

External links

 Salon de la Fama page for Houston Jiménez

1957 births
Living people
Baseball players from Mexico City
Broncos de Reynosa players
Cleveland Indians players
Colorado Springs Sky Sox players
Diablos Rojos del México players
Iowa Oaks players
Key West Cubs players
Langosteros de Cancún players
Major League Baseball players from Mexico
Major League Baseball shortstops
Mexican Baseball Hall of Fame inductees
Mexican expatriate baseball players in Canada
Mexican expatriate baseball players in the United States
Mexican League baseball managers
Mexican League baseball third basemen
Minnesota Twins players
Minor league baseball managers
Pericos de Puebla players
Piratas de Campeche players
Pittsburgh Pirates players
Saraperos de Saltillo players
Toledo Mud Hens players
Vancouver Canadians players